WDTJ-LD is a low power digital television station in Toledo, Ohio, broadcasting locally on channel 18 as an owned-and-operated satellite repeater for the Daystar Television Network

On March 30, 2006, the station was granted a construction permit to begin converting operations to digital television.

A deal was reached to sell W22CO to Word of God Fellowship, owner of the Daystar Television Network, on March 19, 2010.

Per FCC Rules, on December 30, 2011 at 12 AM, WDTJ-LP (68) went silent. This was due to being out of the current DTV spectrum (channels 52 to 69) having to vacate their frequencies.

WDTJ-LD is now active (as received on December 30, 2012) on channel 18 as 68.1

References

FCC's Displacement Dismissal info

External links
Daystar Television Network
W22CO on Michiguide.com
WDTJ's Displacement Application (Dismissed)

DTJ-LD
Daystar (TV network) affiliates
Television channels and stations established in 1989
Low-power television stations in the United States